Khaled Abdulraouf Al Zereiqi (خالد عبد الرؤوف الزريقي; born 14 November 1989) is a Qatari footballer who plays for Umm Salal and the Qatar national football team.

Club career 
Abdulraouf was brought up to play for El Jaish SC Doha at the age of 23. He began his career as an outside midfielder and has transitioned to a defensive midfield position. Abdulraouf has had six career starts with El Jaish with more time likely after his appearance with the Qatar national team in 2014. After a recent injury, Abdulraouf is currently benched for all upcoming club matches, but is expected for recovery.

International career 
In 2014, Abdulraouf along with six of his teammates from El Jaish SC were pulled up to the national team at the request of head coach Fahad Thani. Since this movement, the Qatar national team has competed in one friendly in which Khaled did not receive time. With the 2014 FIFA World Cup in Brazil fast approaching, the number of friendly and official matches will rise come August once this world cup which Qatar did not qualify for is finished. Abdulraouf is expected to receive substantial time increases after their friendly on 13 August as they proceed into their first official matches in early September.

Career statistics

Club

International

External links 
 El Jaish FC
 AFC

1989 births
Living people
Qatari footballers
Qatar international footballers
Al Sadd SC players
Al-Khor SC players
El Jaish SC players
Al-Gharafa SC players
Qatar SC players
Umm Salal SC players
2015 AFC Asian Cup players
Qatar Stars League players
Association football midfielders